The following is a discography of the Canadian band Death from Above.

Albums

Studio albums

Remix albums

Live albums

Extended plays

Singles

Notes

Other charted songs

Music videos

In media 
 Brazilian electro-rock band CSS released a single called "Let's Make Love and Listen to Death From Above".
 "Romantic Rights" was used in the opening credits for the CBC show The Hour, the MTV show Human Giant, and the video game SSX on Tour.
 "Black History Month" is featured in the video game Project Gotham Racing 3.
 "Little Girl" is featured in the video game Major League Baseball 2K7 and Tony Hawk's American Wasteland.
 The Marczech Makuziak remix of "Romantic Rights" is featured in the video game Tourist Trophy.
 A remix of "Romantic Rights" is heard in a club on an episode of CSI: NY.
 "Sexy Results" was featured in the game Saint's Row 2, on one of the in-game radio stations.
 The MSTRKRFT version of "Sexy Results" was used in the commercial for the Motorola Q.
 Various songs were featured in the 2006 run of German television show Die Super Nanny.
 The Bloody Beetroots released a song called "Fucked From Above 1985" on their album Romborama.
 "Turn It Out" is featured in the film Ghost Rider: Spirit of Vengeance.
 Crystal Castles sampled "Dead Womb" in "Untrust Us", the first track off of their eponymous debut LP.
 "Romantic Rights" is played in the background of a scene in the film Scott Pilgrim vs. the World.
 "Crystal Ball" is one of the songs on EA Sports game, FIFA 15 soundtrack.
 "Romantic Rights" is one of the songs on the NBA 2K15 soundtrack.
 "Nothing Left" is one of the songs on the MLB 15: The Show soundtrack.
 "Trainwreck 1979" is featured in TV show Teen Wolf in addition to the video games NHL 15 and Quantum Break. The song also appeared in several promos for Nitro Circus Live and season 3 of Arrow.
 "Always On" is used in Episode 4 of Season 1 of Jessica Jones, "AKA 99 Friends"
 "Freeze Me" is used in Episode 8 of Season 4 of HBO's Silicon Valley and Episode 4 of Season 2 of Netflix's 13 Reasons Why.

References 

Punk rock group discographies
Discographies of Canadian artists
Funk music discographies